Broken Ankles may refer to:

Ankle fractures
Broken Ankles (EP), a 2014 EP by Girl Talk and Freeway